Ian Malcolm Macphee AO (born 13 July 1938) is an Australian former politician who was a member of the House of Representatives from 1974 until 1990.  He is best known for his contributions in developing Australian multiculturalism and for being one of the most prominent moderate Liberal Party of Australia politicians.

Early years
Born in Sydney in 1938, Macphee studied at the University of Sydney and the University of Hawaii, attaining a Bachelor in Law and a Master in Arts, before moving to Melbourne where he served as Director of The Victorian Chamber of Manufacturers.

In 1974 he won the blue-ribbon seat of Balaclava as the Liberal candidate. After the Liberals gained government under the leadership of Malcolm Fraser the following year, Macphee initially remained on the backbench, but in November 1976 he was promoted to the junior ministry where he served as Minister for Productivity.

In government
After three years in the productivity portfolio, Macphee replaced Michael MacKellar as the Minister for Immigration and Ethnic Affairs. Fraser and MacKellar had already adopted the recommendations of the Galbally report, which led to a new framework for migrant settlement. Macphee, with the full support of Fraser, continued the pace of reform, allowing large numbers of Indochinese refugees into Australia and he also introduced a family reunion scheme for these refugees. Macphee was assisted by receiving full bipartisan support from the shadow Immigration Minister Mick Young.

In the 1980 and the 1983 elections, Macphee retained his seat, defeating Labor candidate Chris Kennedy. Macphee helped oversee the introduction of the Special Broadcasting Service. He played an important role in the opening of the Australian Institute of Multicultural Affairs and he worked with the Institute's director, Petro Georgiou, in overseeing government policy in this area.

Macphee later described his time as Immigration Minister as the most "exciting...[and] absolutely enriching" time during his period in parliament.

Macphee became a Cabinet minister in May 1982 when Fraser promoted him to Minister for Employment and Youth Affairs. Macphee defended the role of compulsory arbitration as a means to protect wages in spite of pressure from the more conservative elements within the party, and held this post until the Fraser Government was defeated in March 1983.

In opposition
Upon this defeat, the Liberal Party became badly divided between the moderate (wet) and the conservative (dry) forces within the party. Macphee, as one of the party's leading moderates, became a strong supporter of Andrew Peacock, who defeated John Howard for the leadership of the party. Macphee remained in Shadow Cabinet, continuing as shadow Minister for Employment and Industrial Relations before he was given the job of shadow Minister for Foreign Affairs after the 1984 election.  At this election, Macphee transferred to the newly created Division of Goldstein, essentially a reconfigured version of Balaclava.

In 1985 Howard successfully challenged for the leadership. Macphee stood for the deputy leadership that Howard had vacated, finishing runner-up to Neil Brown with 15 votes out of 70. Howard kept Macphee in the Shadow Cabinet, although he became Shadow Minister for Communications rather than retain his more prestigious former portfolio. Macphee kept this position until April 1987 when Howard sacked him.

In 1988 Howard commented that immigration from Asia should be slowed down. This position attracted criticism from the Labor Party but also many of his colleagues in the Liberal Party, especially from those who had implemented multicultural policies under Fraser. In order to expose Liberal divisions on the issue, Prime Minister Bob Hawke moved a motion in Parliament that race or ethnic origin should never be a criterion for becoming an immigrant to Australia. Macphee was one of the several Liberals who crossed the floor to support the motion and he received support from prominent Liberal Party politicians such as Nick Greiner and Jeff Kennett for his stand.

Preselection challenge
Early in the following year, Macphee lost Liberal preselection in Goldstein—the real contest in this safe Liberal seat—to academic David Kemp. This challenge was portrayed in the media as a "wet" versus "dry" battle, although some commentators, such as Gerard Henderson, argued that Macphee had simply lost the support of the Liberal members in his electorate. Macphee blamed his loss on his decision to oppose Howard's position on Asian immigration. This event further crippled an already divided party and contributed to Howard losing the leadership back to Peacock in May 1989.

With the next election not due until 1990, Macphee briefly returned to Shadow Cabinet under Peacock, again serving as shadow Minister for Foreign Affairs.  He returned to the backbench until retiring prior to the 1990 election.

After politics

Macphee remained in public life. He served on the board of CARE Australia and from 1994 he served as a director of the Australian Broadcasting Corporation for a period of five years. Macphee also worked with fellow former Liberal MP Alan Hunt in reforming the Victorian Legislative Council in a Constitutional Commission set up by the Bracks Labor Government.

On 26 January 1992, he was appointed an Officer of the Order of Australia (AO) for "service to the Australian parliament".

Macphee, given his history with Howard, was critical of the Howard Government, stating that he was "consistently outraged" by the Government's position on refugee policy. He also publicly supported the 2005 "backbench revolt" of Petro Georgiou, Judi Moylan, Bruce Baird and Russell Broadbent, which saw the softening of some aspects of the legislation.

Macphee was also highly critical of the Howard Government's role in the 2003 invasion of Iraq.

In 2017 speaking as a former immigration minister, Macphee criticised the powers held by current Immigration Minister Peter Dutton as "unchecked and unjust."

In 2020, in response to a push from a local group, Voices of Goldstein, Macphee endorsed the push for an independent candidate in his old seat of Goldstein, saying "the Liberal party branches are now controlled by the Liberal party head office, which does not listen to ordinary voters... that's the state we've got to in our democracy which has been abused by power hungry people."

References

|-

.

1938 births
Living people
Liberal Party of Australia members of the Parliament of Australia
Members of the Cabinet of Australia
Members of the Australian House of Representatives
Members of the Australian House of Representatives for Balaclava
Members of the Australian House of Representatives for Goldstein
Officers of the Order of Australia
Politicians from Melbourne
Politicians from Sydney
Australian people of Scottish descent
20th-century Australian politicians